The Blue Coat Church of England School is a specialist secondary school and sixth form located in Coventry, England. It is a Cross Of Nails school, with links to schools all over the world.

History 

Blue coat schools were mainly founded in the 16th century across England as charity schools, where they were known as "bluecoat schools" because of their distinctive blue uniform Blue was traditionally the colour of charity and was a common colour for clothing. The uniform included a blue frock coat and yellow stockings with white bands.

The Coventry Blue Coat Church of England School is now a specialist Music, Maths and Science college, funded by the state, with academy status.
The original Blue Coat school was founded in 1714 as a school for girls and was located close to Holy Trinity church in the city centre of Coventry, close to the ruins of St Mary's Priory and Cathedral.

A new school was opened on the present site in 1964 under headmaster William J Grimes, who ran the school until his retirement in 1980, replaced by Rev R Lewie as Head until 1986. From 1994 to 1999, R. Lewin was headteacher, preceding Stephen Timbrell, who was the headteacher from 1999 until 12 May 2008. Julie Roberts became headteacher in September 2009.

Financial crisis 2015

It was announced in a letter home to parents on 5 March 2015 that the whole governing body of the school was to stepping down to make way for an interim governing body as the school was facing "serious financial issues". A number of support posts were at risk.

On BBC CWR's radio Breakfast show on 5 March 2015 there were calls from parents for Julie Roberts to stand down. The BBC reported that there was a £1.4 million shortfall in funding. Roberts was put on special leave and May 2015 resigned. F. Peacock became interim headteacher and in 2016 Victoria Shelley became the new headteacher, and Peacock reverted to his role in the History department.

As of the end of 2018, the school remained £668,000 in debt to the Education and Skills Funding Agency.

Enrollment in April 2021 is around 1460 pupils, and the school gained an outstanding SIAMS grading in July 2015. It is one of few specialist Music Colleges in the country. It has ties with Coventry Cathedral, and holds several services there every year.

Ethos
At the start of the school year, each form elects several representatives to serve on the year council. Two or three of these year council representatives are elected to serve on the school council. The year councils discuss issues regarding school life and pass their findings to the school council, who consider them. The school council has a budget to facilitate resolution of these issues as long as they support the Christian ethos of the school.

International Cross of Nails School
In the latter part of the Second World War, Coventry Cathedral was heavily bombed during the Coventry Blitz. Three large medieval nails recovered from the ruins of the cathedral were subsequently shaped into a cross. This cross was replicated and became a symbol of peace. Many were presented worldwide to schools and organisations.

Music and Drama

Choir 
The school, which is a specialist music college has an eight-part choir, typically performing choral works ranging from the early works of Thomas Tallis through Joseph Haydn's Insanae et Vanae Curae to the recent works of composers such as John Tavener. The choir visits cathedrals around the country annually, where it sings services for the week whilst the resident choir is away. These have included Chester, York, Blackburn, Salisbury, and Liverpool. The choir has sung mass in St Mark's Basilica, Venice. In the summer of 2007 the choir visited Wells Cathedral.

Other choir activities have included: 
 2010: During the summer the choir sang services in Wells Cathedral. Whilst they were there a CD was recorded, which is still available to purchase from the school's Music Department.
 2011: The choir sang services at York Minster during the summer. The boys section were selected to appear film, 'Nativity 2: Danger in the Manger." Part of the storyline involved having David Tennant as conductor. Venues for the filming were Warwick Castle, Bablake School, and the Courtyard Theatre, Stratford-upon-Avon.
 2012: As part of Coventry Cathedral's Golden Jubilee celebrations, a group of senior members performed in front of a congregation of 2000, which included the Princess Royal and the Archbishop of Canterbury. The choir sang services at Salisbury Cathedral during the summer. 
 2014: The choir performed in front of 2000 at Stoneleigh Park, for a farming event. They also sang many times at Coventry Cathedral, which they do many times a year.
The choir receives additional support from members of the public who bolster the ranks when support is required, providing a more balanced bass and tenor sound.

The choir has been entering the BBC Songs of Praise School Choir of the Year competition , and has come close to winning several times, with the Choir winning the competition in the 2008 finals. The choir is a regular on the BBC Radio 4 programme The Daily Service.

Dramatic productions
The school has at least three annual dramatic productions. There is an annual musical open to all students, recent productions include 'We Will Rock You', 'The Wiz' and 'Hairspray'.  There is a production for students in key stages 4 and 5 such as 'Sleeping Beauty', 'Lord of the Flies', ' The Lady Killers' and 'The Good Person of Schezuan'. Also, an annual production for students in key stage 3, recently 'The Comedy of Errors', 'Ignite' and 'The Canterbury Tales'. The school took a production to the Edinburgh Fringe Festival in 2017, 'One Good Soul'. There are also bespoke community drama projects in partnership with a range of organisations and student directed productions.

Uniform
The current Blue Coat School uniform for Years 7-11 consists of: 
School blazer, white shirt, black trousers or regulation skirt, House tie, black, grey or white socks, black shoes.

House system 
Under Victoria Shelley, the school has implemented a new house system. The houses are named Cavell, Dorsey, Lewis, Parks and Wilberforce. These were chosen to reflect the schools six values: Care, Hard work, Respect, Integrity, Servanthood and Togetherness, an acronym for CHRIST. Tutorials are based on house systems, and contain students from a variety of years to promote inter-year coherence. It also affects the tie a student wear - each house is designated a colour, and each tie has different coloured stripes.

Much like other schools with house systems, there are heads of each house, and prefects (student support members) under each head.

Previously when joining the school (from primary schools) all students were placed in the lower school which was identified by the colour green. In the following year students were placed into one of three traditional houses named after Bishops of Coventry: Neville Gorton, Mervyn Haig, and Cuthbert Bardsley. The houses were identified by the colours red, yellow, and blue respectively.  The houses were localised individually into the three main buildings of the school, but tuition took place across the site (based on academic streaming). Tutor groups were based on the house system and only contained students in the same year group. However, they contained students from each of the different academic streams. The house system was not used in the sixth form which was divided into a "lower sixth" and "upper sixth". 

The academic streaming was initially based on a student's 11+ performance. However, students could move streams based on the school's end of year examinations in the lower school. The streams consisted of classes A and B (equal top stream), C and D (equal second stream), E and F.

References

External links

Secondary schools in Coventry
Bluecoat schools
Educational institutions established in 1714
1714 establishments in England
Church of England secondary schools in the Diocese of Coventry
Academies in Coventry
Coventry Cathedral